Roerichism or Rerikhism (Russian: Рерихи́зм, Рерихиа́нство, Ре́риховское движе́ние) is a spiritual, cultural and social movement that emerged in the United States in the first half of the twentieth century, though it has been described as a "thoroughly Russian new religious movement", due to its close connection with Russia.

The movement centers on the Neo-Theosophical religious doctrine of Agni Yoga, or the Living Ethics, transmitted by Helena Roerich and Nicholas Roerich. Agni Yoga draws ideas from Theosophy, Eastern and Western religions, Vedic and Buddhist traditions, molding them into Russian culture, too. Agni Yoga is the spiritual foundation of Roerichism.

This movement played a significant role in bringing knowledge of Asian religions to the Western world. Roerichism has an international following and has many thousands of adherents. Some international and regional organizations, whose activity is based on the ideas of Roerichism, arose many years after the death of all the members of the Roerich family. Roerichism has exerted an influence on other esoteric movements and philosophies, among them New Age and transhumanism.

Teachers and their teachings
Roerichism is a spiritual and cultural movement centered on the teachings transmitted by Helena and Nicholas Roerich. It draws ideas from Theosophy, Eastern and Western religions, and Vedic and Buddhist traditions, molding them into Russian culture and Russian cosmism.

Helena Roerich

Helena Roerich (1879–1955) was a Russian theosophist, writer, and public figure. In the 20th century, she created, in cooperation with the Teachers of the East (Masters of the Ancient Wisdom), the philosophical teaching of Living Ethics (Agni Yoga).

Helena was born in the family of Ivan Shaposhnikov, a well-known Saint-Petersburg architect. Helena's mother, belonged to an ancient Golenischev-Kutuzov family, which originated from Novgorod at the end of the 13th century. Significant members of this family included knyaz Mikhail Kutuzov, field marshal of the Russian Empire; Arseny Golenishchev-Kutuzov, poet of the end of the 19th century; Ilya Golenishchev-Kutuzov, a philologist and poet; and Modest Mussorgsky, a well-known composer. It was a nobiliary family, distinguished not only for its nobility but for its cultural traditions too. Helena was in frequent communication with artists and scientists of the era, such as Vladimir Bekhterev, Alexander Blok, Sergei Diaghilev, Arkhip Kuindzhi, Vladimir Solovyov, Vladimir Stasov, Igor Stravinsky, and  Mikhail Vrubel.

In 1901 Helena married Nicholas Roerich. Since that time they were inseparable in their life and spiritual-creative paths. She became his companion-in-arms in all his public and cultural undertakings. The Agni Yoga Society was founded by Nicholas and Helena in 1920 in the United States. It is a non-profit educational institution incorporated under the laws of the State of New York. Together with her husband she participated in the heroic Transhimalayan expedition (1924–1928). After the Roerich family settled in Kullu Valley, in the Himalayas, they established the Himalayan Institute of the Scientific Studies, and its honorary president was the foundress Helena Roerich.

The years of life in India were the time of the most intensive work of Helena. Here she completed a major part of books of the Agni Yoga series. She published fourteen volumes of that series. On the frontispieces of the volumes there is no author's name, since Helena Roerich considered that the sacred wisdom contained therein can not be the author's property. She considered herself an author of three books only. They were published under different pen-names: "The Foundations of Buddhism" (1927), "The Cryptograms of the East" (1929), "The Banner of the Reverent Sergius" (1934). Besides, she maintained very active correspondence with many people from Europe, Asia and America. Two volumes of her letters (Letters of Helena Roerich) were published in Riga in 1940. Helena also did the translations. She translated into Russian the extracts from the book The Mahatma Letters to A.P. Sinnett (The Chalice of the East) and also two volumes of The Secret Doctrine by Helena Blavatsky.

Nicholas Roerich

Nicholas Roerich (1874–1947) was a Russian painter, writer, archaeologist, theosophist, philosopher, and public figure. He is perceived by some people as a spiritual teacher and guru.

He studied at the Karl May School, at the Imperial Academy of Arts, and at St. Petersburg University from 1893–1898, and simultaneously at the Law University as well. He wrote,"From 1890s, I saw accurate symbolisms of their people's morals shown in the main directions of philosophy, cultural memorials, monuments, literature and religions from ancient India, China, Tibet and Mongolian culture". For forty-two years Roerich lived in Russia, in India for twenty years, in the United States for three years, in Finland for two years, in France for one year, in England for one year, in China for two years, in Tibet for half a year and in Mongolia for seven–eight months. Roerich twice toured through Central and Eastern Asia, in 1924 and 1934, and following his travels in Mongolia's Gobi, in the Altai Mountains and the Himalayan Mountains, he wrote the books "Heart of Asia" and "Altai-Himalaya". In order for humankind to coexist peacefully, he initiated the Roerich Pact during World War II for the purpose of protecting world cultural values, together with well-known international figures (Albert Einstein, Tagore). Roerich's paintings, so attractive with their combinations of colours, symbols, and secrets, depict hidden ideas and deep meanings. Roerich, knowing the Buddha legend, toured through the Indian and Tibetan mountains looking for the legendary Shambhala. The Roerichs are also famous for introducing Shambhala in the Buddhist teachings of Western countries.

Jawaharlal Nehru's tribute to Roerich,

Roerich's sons
Nicholas and Helena had two children: George (1902 – 1960) and Svetoslav (1904 – 1993).

George de Roerich

In August 1902 their eldest son, George, was born in Okulovka, Novgorod Oblast. After finishing his studies at Karl May School, he entered the Indian and Iranian department of Oriental Languages at London University in 1918. Under the Indologist Edward Denison Ross he studied Sanskrit and Pali. Later he became a world-renowned scientist, orientalist, and guru. George is known for his contributions to Tibetan dialectology, his monumental translation of the Blue Annals, and his 11-volume Tibetan-Russian-English dictionary with Sanskrit parallels. After spending almost thirty years in India, George returned in 1957 to Russia. His return and acquisition of Soviet citizenship was courageous as the USSR's opinion on his family was rather distorted. Because of his effort, bans were lifted on everything associated with Roerichism and the legacy of research left by the family was preserved. The first of Nicholas Roerich's exhibitions was organized in Moscow in 1958, then spread to Leningrad, Riga, Kiev, Tbilisi, and other cities. He was able to dispel myths about the family's philosophy of Agni Yoga or Living Ethics in the USSR. George died on 21 May 1960, and his ashes were placed in Moscow, at the Novodevichy Cemetery. Svetoslav Roerich is the author of the memorial to this outstanding Russian scientists.

Svetoslav Roerich

Their younger son, Svetoslav, was born on 23 October 1904, in Saint Petersburg. In 1914-1916 he studied at the Karl May School. Since 1920 he lived in the United States. Svetoslav entered the Columbia University, where he graduated with a bachelor's degree from the department of architecture. Since 1923 he was a director of the International Centre of Art "Corona Mundi" in New York which was founded by Nicholas Roerich. In 1928 Svetoslav moved from the United States to India (Darjiling), to his family. Studying the culture, art and philosophy of India he created many paintings. Together with landscapes he painted many portraits, including the portraits of Nicholas Roerich, Jawaharlal Nehru and Devika Rani – Svetoslav's wife. One of the most beautiful ones is a portrait of his mother Helena Roerich, the woman of exceptional spiritual and physical beauty. Svetoslav headed the department of folk art and pharmacopoeia at the Institute of Himalayan Studies "Urusvati". In 1989 up to the initiative of Svetoslav the Soviet Foundation of the Roerichs was established in the USSR; at the base of it there were the study and spread of the ideas of Agni Yoga. In 1991 he gave the archives of his parents and his eldest brother, which were kept in India until that time, to the Foundation. On 30 January 1993, Svetoslav died in Bangalore.

Agni Yoga as the spiritual foundation of Roerichism

Religious doctrine
Agni Yoga is a religious doctrine transmitted by the Helena and Nicholas Roerichs from 1920. The followers of Agni Yoga believe that the teaching was given to the Roerich family and their associates by Master Morya, the guru of Helena Roerich and Helena Blavatsky, a founder of the Theosophical Society. In the sixteen volumes of the Teaching of Living Ethics that have been translated into English from the original Russian, as well as in the letters of Helena Roerich, the Agni Yoga teaching is also referred to as the Teaching of Living Ethics, the Teaching of Life, the Teaching of Light, or simply as the Teaching.

Being based on the ancient knowledge of the East and the achievements of modern science in the West, Agni Yoga concerns peculiarities of the cosmic evolution of humanity and creates a new system of perception. The Teaching pays particular attention to the cosmic laws that determine the motion of planets and growth of natural structures, birth of stars, and also human behavior and the development of the universe. The authors of the Teaching state that these laws influence the historic and social processes in human life and unless humanity realizes this life can't be improved. According to Agni Yoga, the universe is the immense spiritual-energy system in which a man plays the most important role. Moral perfection, strict observance of ethical laws and comprehension of the key factor of culture in the development of human society are basic principles of spiritual and historical development of humanity. It is impossible to build a better future without respecting knowledge and culture.

A man, according to the Teaching, influences the cosmic processes greatly. Particular attention is paid to the consciousness of a man and the culture of thinking, since thought is energy, capable of filling space and effecting its surroundings. A man is directly responsible for the quality of his thoughts, words, and deeds, because not only his spiritual and physical health depend on them, but also the condition of the entire planet. Calling people to live in accordance with cosmic laws, Agni Yoga opens unlimited possibilities for the spiritual transformation of life, the expansion of consciousness, and the acquirement of high moral standards.

The Agni Yoga Society

The Agni Yoga Society was founded in 1920 by Helena and Nicholas Roerich. It is a non-profit educational institution incorporated in 1946 under the laws of the State of New York, and is supported entirely by voluntary contributions and membership dues. This organization was located in the building called "Master Apartments". The aims of the Society are embodied in the philosophy that gives it its name — Agni Yoga — as contained in the books of the Agni Yoga series published by the Society. In them is found a synthesis of ancient Eastern beliefs and modern Western thought, and a bridge between the spiritual and the scientific.

Unlike previous yogas, Agni Yoga is a path not of physical disciplines, meditation, or asceticism — but of practice in daily life. It is the yoga of fiery energy, of consciousness, of responsible, directed thought. It teaches that the evolution of the planetary consciousness is a pressing necessity and that, through individual striving, it is an attainable aspiration for mankind. It affirms the existence of the hierarchy of light and the center of the heart as the link with the hierarchy and with the far-off worlds. Though not systematized in an ordinary sense, Agni Yoga is a Teaching that helps the discerning student to discover moral and spiritual guide-posts by which to learn to govern his or her life and thus contribute to the common good. For this reason Agni Yoga has been called a "living ethic". Speaking about the individual's role in human spiritual evolution, Helena Roerich wrote "The greatest benefit that we can contribute consists in the broadening of consciousness, and the improvement and enrichment of our thinking, which, together with the purification of the heart, strengthens our emanations. And thus, raising our vibrations, we restore the health of all that surrounds us".

The Master Institute of United Arts and Nicholas Roerich Museum

The Master Institute of United Arts came into being in 1920 as the Master School of United Arts. It struggled to survive until, in 1922, Louis Horch financed its transfer from a single-room, all-in-one studio at 314 West 54th Street to a mansion he bought on the site where the Master Building would later be constructed. Originally built to house a museum for Nicholas Roerich, a school, an auditorium and a restaurant in a residential hotel, the building was designed by Helmle, Corbett & Harrison and Sugarman & Berger. They were attracted to the spiritual quest in which the Roerichs were engaged and participated in sessions during which Helena Roerich would receive instructions from Master Morya and Nicholas Roerich would record them on scrolls of paper that were later transcribed into a series of texts, the "Leaves of Morya's Garden", which follows, appears to encourage the construction of a building, such as the Master Building, as an educational center for spiritual enlightenment. The Master Institute aimed to give students a well-rounded education in the arts and also to "open the gates to spiritual enlightenment" through culture.

The mansion where it was located also housed the Nicholas Roerich Museum, containing many of the thousands of paintings Roerich had created, and "Corona Mundi", which arranged exhibitions of paintings by Roerich and international artists. The Nicholas Roerich Museum in New York City is dedicated to the works of Nicholas Roerich, whose work focused on nature scenes from the Himalayas. The museum is located in a brownstone at 319 West 107th Street on Manhattan's Upper West Side. The museum was originally located in the Master Apartments at 103rd Street and Riverside Drive, which were built especially for Roerich in 1929. Currently, the museum includes between 100 and 200 of Roerich's works as well as a collection of archival materials. The Nicholas Roerich Museum in New York is the largest center of Roerich-related activity outside of Russia.

Roerich Pact and Banner of Peace
 
 
The Roerich Pact and Banner of Peace movement grew rapidly during the early nineteen-thirties, with centers in a number of countries. There were three international conferences, in Bruges, Belgium, in Montevideo, Uruguay, and in Washington, D.C. The Pact itself declared the necessity for the protection of the cultural product and activity of the world — both during war and peace — and prescribed the method by which all sites of cultural value would be declared neutral and protected, just as the Red Cross does with hospitals. Indeed, the Roerich Pact was often called The Red Cross of Culture:

Some ideas of the Roerich Pact still are not implemented in the international law, especially its principle of preference for the preservation of cultural values over military necessity.

The American-Russian Cultural Association
The American-Russian Cultural Association (Russian: Америка́но–ру́сская культу́рная ассоциа́ция) was organized in the USA in 1942 to encourage cultural ties between the Soviet Union and the United States, with Nicholas Roerich as honorary president. The group's first annual report was issued the following year. The group does not appear to have lasted much past Nicholas Roerich's death in 1947.

International Center of the Roerichs and Museum named after Nicholas Roerich
The International Center of the Roerichs (Russian: Междунаро́дный це́нтр Ре́рихов) is a non-governmental public association of citizens and public associations incorporated on the basis of their common interests in the cause of study, preservation, and popularization of the Roerich family heritage. The Center is an associated member of the Non-Governmental Organizations Association under the United Nations Department of Public Information.

The Museum named after Nicholas Roerich (Russian: Музе́й и́мени Н. К. Ре́риха Междунаро́дного це́нтра Ре́рихов) contains the Roerichs' cultural heritage passed on to the Soviet Roerichs' Foundation (now International Center of the Roerichs) by Svetoslav Roerich in 1990. It carries with itself a new cosmic world view. The core of Roerichism is the philosophy of cosmic reality – Agni Yoga, which develops the idea of a close relationship between mankind and the cosmos and transmits knowledge which assists in understanding the features peculiar to the new evolutionary stage of mankind's development.

Post-Roerichian teaching of life
The Teaching of Life, which contains a new, cosmic worldview, has played and continues to play an enormous role in
paving the way for spiritual evolution. The Roerich movement, like any social movement in the process of formation, has its difficulties and problems. Some international and regional organizations, whose activity is based on the ideas of Roerichism, arose many years after the death of all members of the Roerich family.

The World Organisation of Culture of Health (WOCH)
The World Organisation of Culture of Health was founded in the year 1994. Victor Skumin was elected to the post of president-founder of the World Organisation of Culture of Health — International social movement "To Health via Culture" (Russian: Междунаро́дное обще́ственное Движе́ние «К Здоро́вью че́рез Культу́ру»). The organization operates in accordance with what written in the charter registered with the Ministry of Justice of the Russian Federation. A key element of a "Culture of Health" is to implement innovative health programs that support a holistic approach to physical, mental and spiritual well-being both inside and outside the workplace.

This organization, in order to promote international relations, has established a link with the International Buddhist Meditation Centre at Kathmandu. The Russian Orthodox Church is critical of the WOCH and qualifies its ideology of Agni Yoga as New Age:

The relationship between Skumin's doctrine of culture of health and Roerichism is also confirmed by some scientists, such as V. P. Goraschuk, professor at H.S. Skovoroda Kharkiv National Pedagogical University. In 2004, he wrote in his thesis for a doctor's degree on the speciality "general pedagogics and history of pedagogics",

The anthem of WOCH ("To Health via Culture") consists of four stanzas. The capital letters each of the four stanzas form the word Agni..
Another hymn by Skumin is termed "Urusvati". Helena Roerich, known as the Tara Urusvati in Agni Yoga and Roerichism. The hymn begins with the phrase "The fire of the heart ignites Urusvati, she teaches the spirit take-off on the wings of the grace".

Skumin elaborated on the conceptions of spiritual evolution and proposed (1990) the classification of Homo spiritalis (Latin: "spiritual man"), the sixth root race, consisting of eight sub-races (subspecies) – HS0 Anabiosis spiritalis, HS1 Scientella spiritalis, HS2 Aurora spiritalis, HS3 Ascensus spiritalis, HS4 Vocatus spiritalis, HS5 Illuminatio spiritalis, НS6 Creatio spiritalis, and HS7 Servitus spiritalis.

The Journal of the World Organisation of Culture of Health ("World Health Culture Organization") is based in Novocheboksarsk. In 1995, Victor Skumin became the first editor-in-chief of the journal To Health via Culture. The journal received an International Standard Serial Number (ISSN) 0204-3440. The main topics of the magazine are the dissemination of ideas of culture of health, holistic medicine, Roerichism, and Agni Yoga.

The Organization also has its own publishing house ("To Health via Culture"), which has the right to publish the books with the International Standard Book Number (ISBN).

See also

References

Sources
 
 
 Also on

External links
 Agni Yoga Society
 Nicholas Roerich Museum (New York)
 World Organisation of Culture of Health

Videos
 
 
 
 
 

 
20th-century philosophy
Cosmism
Roerich family
Russian culture
Russian philosophy
Spiritual evolution
Theosophy
Transhumanism